Viktor Vasilievich Donskikh (8 July 1935 – 4 October 2022) was a Soviet-Russian politician.

Donskikh died in Lipetsk on 4 October 2022, at the age of 87.

References

1935 births
2022 deaths
Russian politicians
Russian communists
Communist Party of the Soviet Union members
Central Committee of the Communist Party of the Soviet Union members
Members of the Supreme Soviet of the Russian Soviet Federative Socialist Republic, 1985–1990
Russian people of Ukrainian descent
Heroes of Socialist Labour
Recipients of the Order of Lenin
Recipients of the Order of the Red Banner of Labour
People from Krasnodon